A groin hernia may refer to:

 Inguinal hernia, a hernia through the inguinal canal
 Femoral hernia, a hernia through the femoral canal
 Velpeau hernia, a rare hernia in the groin in front of the femoral blood vessels